"Good Times" is a song written and recorded by Sam Cooke, released as single in 1964.

Critical reception
In a retrospective review in 1971, music critic Dave Marsh wrote that "at his very best, Cooke utilized a perfect lyrical sentimentality... listen to 'Good Times' – It might be one o'clock and it might be three/Time don't mean that much to me/Ain't felt this good since I don't know when/And I might not feel this good again/So come on baby, let the good times roll/We gonna stay here til we soothe our soul. That summed up perfectly what rock and roll was about, and still is, in so many ways."

Personnel
Featured musicians are John Ewing (trombone), Edward Hall (drums and percussion), John Pisano (guitar), Clifton White (guitar) and Johnnie Taylor (back-up vocals).

Chart positions

Sam Cooke
The Sam Cooke version of the song hit number one on the Cash Box R&B chart and number eleven on the Billboard Hot 100.

Dan Seals version

Dan Seals' version was a Number One hit on Billboard'''s Hot Country Singles & Tracks chart in mid-1990, and is the second single from his 1990 album On Arrival''. His version stayed at number 1 for two weeks, and was his last number 1 hit, as well as his last top 40 hit of his career.

Chart performance

Year-end charts

Popular culture
In 2011, Nike used the song in a commercial featuring Oklahoma City Thunder forward Kevin Durant during their "Basketball Never Stops" ad campaign during the 2011 NBA lockout.

References

1964 singles
1990 singles
Sam Cooke songs
Dan Seals songs
Phoebe Snow songs
Songs written by Sam Cooke
Song recordings produced by Kyle Lehning
RCA Records singles
Capitol Records Nashville singles
Song recordings produced by Hugo & Luigi
1964 songs